The 69 Medium Regiment is part of the Regiment of Artillery of the Indian Army.

Formation 
The regiment was raised on 1 February 1963 at Jalandhar Cantonment as the 69 Field Regiment. The first commanding officer was Lieutenant Colonel P K H Chand. The regiment was subsequently converted to a medium regiment in April 2010.

Operations
The regiment has taken part in the following operations:

Indo-Pakistani War of 1965 
The regiment took part in Operation Ablaze and Operation Riddle during the war. It was part of the 14th Infantry Division and saw action in Punjab.

Nathu La clashes 
The regiment provided effective artillery fire during the clashes with the Chinese in 1967. The gun area of the unit was visited by then prime minister Indira Gandhi in May 1968.

Indo-Pakistani War of 1971 
The regiment was part of 54 Artillery Brigade of the 54 Infantry Division. It was deployed in the western sector around Samba during Operation Cactus Lily.

It won the following gallantry awards:
Sena Medal – Captain Madan Mohan Sharmrao Gadagkar, and Captain Asit Chaudhuri.
Mentioned in dispatches – Major Gopal Kartic, Captain Mela Ram Sharma, Subedar Ramchand Shinde, Lance Naik Kalla Venkata Ratnam, Lance Naik Ram Bapu Pawar, and Naik Sitaram Deshmukh.

Operation Blue Star 
The regiment provided aid to the civil administration in maintaining law and order in Punjab during operations in 1984 to flush out terrorists from the Golden Temple.

Operation Brasstacks 
The regiment was able to deploy in the western sector at very short notice for operations in 1987.

Operation Falcon 
In Operation Falcon during the Sumdorong Chu standoff, the regiment was deployed between 1987 and 1990 in the Eastern sector. 

During this tenure, Captain (later Major General) Virender Kumar Yadav of the regiment was awarded the Shaurya Chakra for an act of bravery. On 11 November 1989, while traveling by train, he displayed conspicuous courage under grave threat to his own life and rescued many people when a large mob set fire to the North East Express at Phaphund.

Operation Rakshak and Operation Vijay 
During and after the incident in Lachimpora, the regiment has taken part in counter insurgency operations in Jammu and Kashmir and has successfully completed three tenures in the state (1994, 1999 and 2007). It was also mobilized in the Kargil War.

Operation Parakram 
The regiment was deployed in the Northern Command area during the 2001-2002 India-Pakistan standoff in 2001. It lost a young officer, Lieutenant Abhay Pareek on 10 June 2002. On 31 July 2002, the regiment also lost Captain Rapolu Veera Raja Reddy at Rajouri in anti-militancy operations.

Honors and achievements
The regiment has been awarded the following awards –
Shaurya Chakra – 1
Sena Medal – 3 
Mentioned in dispatches – 6
COAS Commendation Cards – 3
GOC-in-C Commendation Cards – 5

See also

 List of artillery regiments of Indian Army

References

Military units and formations established in 1963
Artillery regiments of the Indian Army after 1947